Le Répertoire de la Cuisine is a professional reference cookbook written by Théodore Gringoire and Louis Saulnier and published originally in 1914, and translated into multiple languages. It is intended to serve as a quick reference to Le guide culinaire by Saulnier's mentor, Auguste Escoffier, and adds a significant amount of Saulnier's own material.

History

Louis Saulnier, a student of Auguste Escoffier, wrote the Répertoire as a guide to his mentor's cooking as documented in Le Guide Culinaire. It is a standard reference for classical French haute cuisine and has been translated into English by Édouard Brunet (1924) and Spanish (2012). The 1976 American edition has an introduction by Jacques Pépin. The 15th English edition of The Cookery Repertory was published by Leon Jaeggi & Sons Ltd, London, in 1979.

In Michael Ruhlman's 2009 book Ratio, Culinary Institute of America instructor Uwe Hestnar cited La répertoire alongside Larousse Gastronomique and the works of Escoffier and Carême as required reading for anyone interested in classical French cooking.

Format
The style of Le Répertoire is highly condensed, even in comparison with the brevity of its inspiration; the recipes provided are little more than simple descriptions of dishes, and assume a great deal of background knowledge. The structure of the book itself is based on Escoffier's original to simplify cross-referencing.

References

External links
 Full text online (3rd edition) at Gallica digital library

Cookbooks
1914 non-fiction books